Joel Skornicka ( – ) was Mayor of Madison, Wisconsin from 1979 to 1983. Prior to becoming Mayor, he served as Assistant Chancellor of the University of Wisconsin-Madison. Skornicka received his bachelor's degree in political science in 1958 and his master's degree in public policy and administration in 1975, from University of Wisconsin–Madison He was an Independent.

References

1937 births
2019 deaths
Mayors of Madison, Wisconsin
Wisconsin Independents
 University of Wisconsin–Madison College of Letters and Science alumni
 Leaders of the University of Wisconsin-Madison
 Robert M. La Follette School of Public Affairs alumni